The 1925 Campeonato Carioca, the twentieth edition of that championship, kicked off on April 26, 1925 and ended on December 20, 1925. It was organized by AMEA (Associação Metropolitana de Esportes Atléticos, or Metropolitan Athletic Sports Association). Ten teams participated. Flamengo won the title for the 5th time. No teams were relegated.

Participating teams 

Despite AMEA having CBD's official acknowledgement as the official Distrito Federal football league, due to Vasco da Gama's popularity, LMDT's league still had greater attendances, which led AMEA to invite Vasco into the league again, now with the requirements for their entry relaxed, but with the condition that the club didn't play its home matches at their field in the Moraes e Silva street and built a appropriate stadium, which would be completed in 1927. Aside from Vasco, Syrio e Libanez, that also had left LMDT in 1924 but hadn't been included in the 1924 championship entered the championship too. Vasco's exit from LMDT motivated some of the larger clubs in that league to join AMEA as well, but only Vasco was included in the First level, with the others joining the Second level. LMDT continued holding its own championships until 1934, but none of their championships held after 1924 are considered official.

System 
The tournament would be disputed in a double round-robin format, with the team with the most points winning the title.

Championship

References 

Campeonato Carioca seasons
Carioca